The Council of Florence is the seventeenth ecumenical council recognized by the Catholic Church, held between 1431 and 1449. It was convoked as the Council of Basel by Pope Martin V shortly before his death in February 1431 and took place in the context of the Hussite Wars in Bohemia and the rise of the Ottoman Empire. At stake was the greater conflict between the conciliar movement and the principle of papal supremacy.

The Council entered a second phase after Emperor Sigismund's death in 1437. Pope Eugene IV translated the Council to Ferrara on 8 January 1438, where it became the Council of Ferrara and succeeded in drawing some of the Byzantine ambassadors who were in attendance at Basel to Italy. Some Council members rejected the papal decree and remained at Basel: this rump Council suspended Eugene, declared him a heretic, and then in November 1439 elected an antipope, Felix V.

After becoming the Council of Florence (having moved to avoid the plague in Ferrara), the Council concluded in 1445 after negotiating unions with the various eastern churches. This bridging of the Great Schism proved fleeting, but was a political coup for the papacy. In 1447, Sigismund's successor Frederick III commanded the city of Basel to expel the Council of Basel; the rump Council reconvened in Lausanne before dissolving itself in 1449.

Background
The initial location in the Prince-Bishopric of Basel reflected the desire among parties seeking reform to meet outside territories directly controlled by the Pope, the Emperor or the kings of Aragon and France, whose influences the council hoped to avoid.  Ambrogio Traversari attended the Council of Basel as legate of Pope Eugene IV.

Under pressure for ecclesiastical reform, Pope Martin V sanctioned a decree of the Council of Constance (9 October 1417) obliging the papacy to summon general councils periodically. At the expiration of the first term fixed by this decree, Pope Martin V complied by calling a council at Pavia. Due to an epidemic the location transferred almost at once to Siena (see Council of Siena) and disbanded, in circumstances still imperfectly known, just as it had begun to discuss the subject of reform (1424). The next council fell due at the expiration of seven years in 1431; Martin V duly convoked it for this date to the town of Basel and selected to preside over it the cardinal Julian Cesarini, a well-respected prelate. Martin himself, however, died before the opening of the synod.

Council of Basel
The Council was seated on 14 December 1431, at a period when the conciliar movement was strong and the authority of the papacy weak. The Council at Basel opened with only a few bishops and abbots attending, but it grew rapidly and to make its numbers greater gave the lower orders a majority over the bishops. It adopted an anti-papal attitude, proclaimed the superiority of the Council over the Pope, and prescribed an oath to be taken by each new Pope. On 18 December Martin's successor, Pope Eugene IV, tried to dissolve it and open a new council on Italian soil at Bologna, but he was overruled.

The council was held in the Cathedral of Basel, where benches were placed for the 400 and more members, and general congregations were held either in the cathedral or in its chapter house. The clerks of ceremonies were Enea Silvio Piccolomini and Michel Brunout.

Sigismund, King of Hungary and titular King of Bohemia, had been defeated at the Battle of Domažlice in the fifth crusade against the Hussites in August 1431. Under his sponsorship,  the Council negotiated a peace with the Calixtine faction of the Hussites in January 1433. Pope Eugene acknowledged the council in May and crowned Sigismund Holy Roman Emperor on 31 May 1433. The divided Hussites were defeated in May 1434. In June 1434, the pope had to flee a revolt in Rome and began a ten-year exile in Florence.

Replacement by the Council of Florence
In 1438, Pope Eugene convened a new council at Ferrara, which however was transferred to Florence in 1439 because of the danger of plague at Ferrara and because Florence had agreed, against future payment, to finance the Council.

Rump Council of Basel
Most of the original Council moved from Basel to Ferrara in 1438. Some remained at Basel, still claiming to be the Council. They elected Amadeus VIII, Duke of Savoy, as Pope Felix V. He is considered an antipope, and was the only claimant to the papal throne who ever took the Basel oath. Driven out of Basel in 1448, they moved to Lausanne. In 1449, Felix V resigned and the rump Council formally closed.

Meeting in Florence
The Council had meanwhile successfully negotiated reunification with several Eastern Churches, reaching agreements on such matters as the Western insertion of the phrase "Filioque" to the Nicene-Constantinopolitan Creed, the definition and number of the sacraments, and the doctrine of Purgatory. Another key issue was papal primacy, which involved the universal and supreme jurisdiction of the Bishop of Rome over the whole Church, including the national Churches of the East (Serbian, Byzantine, Moldo-Wallachian, Bulgarian, Russian, Georgian, Armenian etc.), and nonreligious matters such as the promise of military assistance against the Ottoman Empire.

The union was proclaimed in the document Laetentur Caeli ("Let the Heavens Rejoice") on 6 July 1439, composed by Pope Eugene and signed by Emperor Sigismund and all but one of the bishops present. Some Greek bishops, perhaps feeling political pressure from the Byzantine Emperor, reluctantly accepted the decrees of the Council. Other Eastern bishops did so by sincere conviction, such as Isidore of Kiev, who subsequently suffered greatly for it. Only one Eastern Bishop refused to accept the union, Mark of Ephesus, who became the leader of opposition back in Byzantium; the Serbian patriarch did not even attend the council. The Russian Orthodox Church, upon learning of the union, angrily rejected it and ousted any prelate who was even remotely sympathetic to it, declaring itself autocephalous (i.e., autonomous).

Despite the religious union, Western military assistance to Byzantium was ultimately insufficient, and the fall of Constantinople occurred in May 1453. The Council declared the Basel group heretics and excommunicated them, and affirmed the superiority of the Pope over the Councils in the bull Etsi non dubitemus of 20 April 1441.

Composition
The democratic character of the assembly at Basel was a result of both its composition and its organization. Doctors of theology, masters and representatives of chapters, monks and clerks of inferior orders constantly outnumbered the prelates in it, and the influence of the superior clergy had less weight because instead of being separated into "nations", as at Constance, the fathers divided themselves according to their tastes or aptitudes into four large committees or "deputations" (deputationes). One was concerned with questions of faith (fidei), another with negotiations for peace (pacis), the third with reform (reformatorii), and the fourth with what they called "common concerns" (pro communibus). Every decision made by three "deputations" (the lower clergy formed the majority in each) received ratification for the sake of form in general congregation and, if necessary led to decrees promulgated in session. Papal critics thus termed the council "an assembly of copyists" or even "a set of grooms and scullions". However, some prelates, although absent, were represented by their proxies.

Nicholas of Cusa was a member of the delegation sent to Constantinople with the pope's approval to bring back the Byzantine emperor and his representatives to the Council of Florence of 1439. At the time of the council's conclusion in 1439, Cusa was thirty-eight years old and thus, compared to the other clergy at the council, a fairly young man though one of the more accomplished in terms of the body of his complete works.

Attempted dissolution
From Italy, France and Germany, the fathers came late to Basel. Cesarini devoted all his energies to the war against the Hussites until the disaster of Taus forced him to evacuate Bohemia in haste. Pope Eugene IV, Martin V's successor, lost hope that the council could be useful owing to the progress of heresy, the reported troubles in Germany, the war that had lately broken out between the dukes of Austria and Burgundy, and finally, the small number of fathers who had responded to the summons of Martin V. That opinion and his desire to preside over the council in person, induced him to recall the fathers from Germany, as his poor health made it difficult for him to go. He commanded the council to disperse, and appointed Bologna as their meeting place in eighteen months' time, with the intention of making the session of the council coincide with some conferences with representatives of the Orthodox Church of the Byzantine East, scheduled to be held there with a view to ecumenical union (18 December 1431).

That order led to an outcry among the fathers and incurred the deep disapproval of the legate Cesarini. They argued that the Hussites would think the Church afraid to face them and that the laity would accuse the clergy of shirking reform, both with disastrous effects. The pope explained his reasons and yielded certain points, but the fathers were intransigent. Considerable powers had been decreed to Church councils by the Council of Constance, which amid the troubles of the Western Schism had proclaimed the superiority, in certain cases, of the council over the pope, and the fathers at Basel insisted upon their right of remaining assembled. They held sessions, promulgated decrees, interfered in the government of the papal countship of Venaissin, treated with the Hussites, and, as representatives of the universal Church, presumed to impose laws upon the sovereign pontiff himself.

Eugene IV resolved to resist the Council's claim of supremacy, but he did not dare openly to repudiate the conciliar doctrine considered by many to be the actual foundation of the authority of the popes before the schism. He soon realized the impossibility of treating the fathers of Basel as ordinary rebels, and tried a compromise; but as time went on, the fathers became more and more intractable, and between him and them gradually arose an impassable barrier.

Abandoned by a number of his cardinals, condemned by most of the powers, deprived of his dominions by condottieri who shamelessly invoked the authority of the council, the pope made concession after concession and ended on 15 December 1433 with a pitiable surrender of all the points at issue in a papal bull, the terms of which were dictated by the fathers of Basel, that is, by declaring his bull of dissolution null and void and recognising that the synod as legitimately assembled throughout. However, Eugene IV did not ratify all the decrees coming from Basel, nor make a definite submission to the supremacy of the council. He declined to express any forced pronouncement on this subject, and his enforced silence concealed the secret design of safeguarding the principle of sovereignty.

The fathers, filled with suspicion, would allow only the legates of the pope to preside over them on condition of their recognizing the superiority of the council. The legates submitted the humiliating formality but in their own names, it was asserted only after the fact, thus reserving the final judgment of the Holy See. Furthermore, the difficulties of all kinds against which Eugene had to contend, such as the insurrection at Rome, which forced him to escape by means of the Tiber, lying in the bottom of a boat, left him at first little chance of resisting the enterprises of the council.

Issues of reform
Emboldened by their success, the fathers approached the subject of reform, their principal object being to further curtail the power and resources of the papacy. They took decisions on the disciplinary measures that regulated the elections, on the celebration of divine service and on the periodical holding of diocesan synods and provincial councils, which were usual topics in Catholic councils. They also made decrees aimed at some of the assumed rights by which the popes had extended their power and improved their finances at the expense of the local churches. Thus the council abolished annates, greatly limited the abuse of "reservation" of the patronage of benefices by the Pope and completely abolished the right claimed by the pope of "next presentation" to benefices not yet vacant (known as gratiae expectativae). Other conciliar decrees severely limited the jurisdiction of the court of Rome and even made rules for the election of popes and the constitution of the Sacred College. The fathers continued to devote themselves to the subjugation of the Hussites, and they also intervened, in rivalry with the pope, in the negotiations between France and England, which led to the treaty of Arras, concluded by Charles VII of France with the duke of Burgundy. Also, circumcision was deemed to be a mortal sin. Finally, they investigated and judged numbers of private cases, lawsuits between prelates, members of religious orders and holders of benefices, thus themselves committing one of the serious abuses for which they had criticized the court of Rome.

Papal primacy
The Council clarified the Latin dogma of papal primacy:

Eugene IV's eastern strategy

Eugene IV, however much he may have wished to keep on good terms with the fathers of Basel, found himself neither able nor willing to accept or observe all their decrees. The question of the union with the Byzantine church, especially, gave rise to a misunderstanding between them which soon led to a rupture. The Byzantine emperor John VIII Palaiologos, pressed hard by the Ottoman Turks, was keen to ally himself with the Catholics. He consented to come with the principal representatives of the Byzantine Church to some place in the West where the union could be concluded in the presence of the pope and of the Latin council. There arose a double negotiation between him and Eugene IV on the one hand and the fathers of Basel on the other. The council wished to fix the meeting-place at a place remote from the influence of the pope, and they persisted in suggesting Basel, Avignon or Savoy. On the other hand, the Byzantines wanted a coastal location in Italy for their ease of access by ship.

Council transferred to Ferrara and attempted reunion with Eastern Orthodox Churches

As a result of negotiations with the East, Emperor John VIII Palaiologos accepted Pope Eugene IV's offer. By a bull dated 18 September 1437, Pope Eugene again pronounced the dissolution of the Council of Basel and summoned the fathers to Ferrara in the Po Valley.

The first public session at Ferrara began on 10 January 1438. Its first act declared the Council of Basel transferred to Ferrara and nullified all further proceedings at Basel. In the second public session (15 February 1438), Pope Eugene IV excommunicated all who continued to assemble at Basel.

In early April 1438, the Byzantine contingent, over 700 strong, arrived at Ferrara. On 9 April 1438, the first solemn session at Ferrara began, with the Eastern Roman Emperor, the Patriarch of Constantinople and representatives of the Patriarchal Sees of Antioch, Alexandria and Jerusalem in attendance and Pope Eugene IV presiding. The early sessions lasted until 17 July 1438 with each theological issue of the East–West Schism (1054) hotly debated, including the Processions of the Holy Spirit, the Filioque clause in the Nicene Creed, purgatory, and papal primacy. Resuming proceedings on 8 October 1438, the Council focused exclusively on the Filioque matter. Even as it became clear that the Byzantine Church would never consent to the Filioque clause, the Byzantine Emperor continued to press for a reconciliation.

Initially, the seating arrangements were meant to feature the pope in the middle with the Latins on one side and Greeks on the other, but the Greeks protested. It was decided to have the altar with the open Bible in the center of the one end of the chamber, and the two high ranking delegations facing each other on the sides of the altar, while the rest of the delegations were below further in chamber. The Byzantine Emperor's throne was opposite that of the Holy Roman Emperor (who never attended), while the Patriarch of Constantinople faced opposite a cardinal, and the other high-ranking cardinals and bishops faced the Greek metropolitans. The throne of the pope was slightly set a part and higher.

Council transferred to Florence and the near East-West union
With finances running thin and on the pretext that the plague was spreading in the area, both the Latins and the Byzantines agreed to transfer the council to Florence. Continuing at Florence in January 1439, the Council made steady progress on a compromise formula, "ex filio".

In the following months, agreement was reached on the Western doctrine of Purgatory and a return to the pre-schism prerogatives of the papacy. On 6 July 1439 an agreement (Laetentur Caeli) was signed by all the Eastern bishops but one, Mark of Ephesus, delegate for the Patriarch of Alexandria, who, contrary to the views of all others, held that Rome continued in both heresy and schism.

To complicate matters, Patriarch Joseph II of Constantinople had died the previous month. The Byzantine Patriarchs were unable to assert that ratification by the Eastern Church could be achieved without a clear agreement of the whole Church.

Upon their return, the Eastern bishops found their attempts toward agreement with the West broadly rejected by the monks, the populace, and by civil authorities (with the notable exception of the Emperors of the East who remained committed to union until the fall of the Byzantine Empire to the Turkish Ottoman Empire two decades later). Facing the imminent threat, the Union was officially proclaimed by Isidore of Kiev in Hagia Sophia on 12 December 1452.

The Emperor, bishops, and people of Constantinople accepted this act as a temporary provision until the removal of the Ottoman threat.  Yet, it was too late: on 29 May 1453 Constantinople fell. The union signed at Florence, down to the present, has not been implemented by the Orthodox Churches.

Copts and Ethiopians

The Council soon became even more international. The signature of this agreement for the union of the Latins and the Byzantines encouraged Pope Eugenius to announce the good news to the Coptic Christians, and invite them to send a delegation to Florence. He wrote a letter on 7 July 1439, and to deliver it, sent Alberto da Sarteano as an apostolic delegate. On 26 August 1441, Sarteano returned with four Ethiopians from Emperor Zara Yaqob and Copts. According to a contemporary observer "They were black men and dry and very awkward in their bearing (...) really, to see them they appeared to be very weak". At that time, Rome had delegates from a multitude of nations, from Armenia to Russia, Greece and various parts of north and east Africa.

Deposition of Eugene IV and schism at Basel
During this time the council of Basel, though nullified at Ferrara and abandoned by Cesarini and most of its members, persisted nonetheless, under the presidency of Cardinal Aleman. Affirming its ecumenical character on 24 January 1438, it suspended Eugene IV. The council went on (in spite of the intervention of most of the powers) to pronounce Eugene IV deposed (25 June 1439), giving rise to a new schism by electing (4 November 1439) duke Amadeus VIII of Savoy, as (anti)pope, who took the name of Felix V.

Effects of the schism
This schism lasted fully ten years, although the antipope found few adherents outside of his own hereditary states, those of Alfonso V of Aragon, of the Swiss confederation and of certain universities. Germany remained neutral; Charles VII of France confined himself to securing to his kingdom (by the Pragmatic Sanction of Bourges, which became law on 13 July 1438) the benefit of a great number of the reforms decreed at Basel; England and Italy remained faithful to Eugene IV. Finally, in 1447, Frederick III, Holy Roman Emperor, after negotiations with Eugene, commanded the burgomaster of Basel not to allow the presence of the council any longer in the imperial city.

Schism reconciled at Lausanne
In June 1448 the rump of the council migrated to Lausanne. The antipope, at the insistence of France, ended by abdicating (7 April 1449). Eugene IV died on 23 February 1447, and the council at Lausanne, to save appearances, gave their support to his successor, Pope Nicholas V, who had already been governing the Church for two years. Trustworthy evidence, they said, proved to them that this pontiff accepted the dogma of the superiority of the council as defined at Constance and at Basel.

Aftermath
The struggle for East-West union at Ferrara and Florence, while promising, never bore fruit. While progress toward union in the East continued to be made in the following decades, all hopes for a proximate reconciliation were dashed with the fall of Constantinople in 1453. Following their conquest, the Ottomans encouraged hardline anti-unionist Orthodox clerics in order to divide European Christians.

Perhaps the council's most important historical legacy was the lectures on Greek classical literature given in Florence by many of the delegates from Constantinople, including the renowned Neoplatonist Gemistus Pletho. These greatly helped the progress of Renaissance humanism.

See also
 Compacts of Basel
 Ecclesiastical differences between the Catholic Church and the Eastern Orthodox Church
 Theological differences between the Catholic Church and the Eastern Orthodox Church
 Valori (family)

References

Sources
Primary sources
 Gian Domenico Mansi (ed.),  Sacrorum Conciliorum nova et amplissima collectio  editio nova  vol. xxix–xxxi.
 Aeneas Sylvius Piccolomini, Pope Pius II, De rebus Basileae gestis (Fermo, 1803)
 Monumenta Conciliorum generalium seculi xv., Scriptorum, vol. i., ii. and iii. (Vienna, 1857–1895)
 Sylvester Syropoulos, Mémoires, ed. and trans. V. Laurent, Concilium Florentinum: Documenta et Scriptores 9 (Rome, 1971)

Secondary literature
 Deno J. Geanakoplos, 'The Council of Florence (1438–9) and the Problem of Union between the Byzantine and Latin Churches', in Church History 24 (1955), 324–346 and reprinted in D.J. Geanakoplos, Constantinople and the West (Madison, Wisconsin, 1989), pp. 224–254
 Sergey F. Dezhnyuk, "Council of Florence: The Unrealized Union", CreateSpace, 2017.
 J. C. L. Gieseler, Ecclesiastical History, vol. iv. pp. 312ff (Eng. trans., Edinburgh, 1853).
 Joseph Gill, The Council of Florence Cambridge, 1959.
 Joseph Gill, Personalities of the Council, of Florence and other Essays, Oxford, 1964.
 Johannes Haller ed., Concilium Basiliense, vol. i–v, Basel, 1896–1904.
 Hefele, Conciliengeschichte, vol. vii., Freiburg-im-Breisgau, 1874.
 Jonathan Harris, The End of Byzantium, New Haven and London, 2010. 
 Jonathan Harris, Greek Emigres in the West c. 1400–1520, Camberley, 1995, pp. 72–84.
 , Das Basler Konzil; 1431–1449; Forschungsstand und Probleme, (Cologne, 1987).
 Sebastian Kolditz, Johannes VIII. Palaiologos und das Konzil von Ferrara-Florenz (1438/39). 2 Vol., Stuttgart: Anton Hiersemann Verlag 2013–2014, .
 Stuart M. McManus, 'Byzantines in the Florentine polis: Ideology, Statecraft and Ritual during the Council of Florence', Journal of the Oxford University History Society, 6 (Michaelmas 2008/Hilary 2009) 
 Stavros Lazaris, "L'empereur Jean VIII Paléologue vu par Pisanello lors du concile de Ferrare – Florence", Byzantinische Forschungen, 29, 2007, pp. 293–324 "L'empereur Jean VIII Paléologue vu par Pisanello lors du concile de Ferrare-Florence"
 Donald M. Nicol, The Last Centuries of Byzantium, 1261–1453, 2nd ed., Cambridge, 1993, 2nd ed., pp. 306–317, 339–368.
 , Le Cardinal Louis Aleman, président du concile de Bâle, Paris, 1904.
 , Die Organisation and Geschäftsordnung des Basler Konziis, Leipzig, 1877.
 Stefan Sudmann, Das Basler Konzil: Synodale Praxis zwischen Routine und Revolution, Frankfurt-am-Main 2005.  
 Georgiou Frantzi, " Constantinople has Fallen.Chronicle of the Fall of Constantinoples ", transl.: Ioannis A. Melisseidis & Poulcheria Zavolea Melisseidou (1998/2004) – Ioannis A. Melisseidis ( Ioannes A. Melisseides ),  " Brief History of Events in Constantinople during the period 1440–1453 ", pp. 105–119, edit.5th,  Athens 2004, Vergina Asimakopouli Bros, Greek National Bibliography 1999/2004,  
 

Attribution:

External links

 Byzantines in the Florentine polis: Ideology, Statecraft and ritual during the Council of Florence
 Detailed chronology of the Consilium
 Catholic Encyclopedia: Council of Basle
 Catholic Encyclopedia: Ferrara
 Catholic Encyclopedia: Council of Florence
 Documents of Council of Florence

Further reading 
Fatto dei Greci: Pictorial Allusions to the Nearly-Forgotten Council of Florence
Council of Florence: The Unrealized Union

15th-century elections
Florence
East–West Schism
Florence
Florence
1430s in Europe
1440s in Europe
15th-century Eastern Orthodoxy
History of Eastern Catholicism
Catholicisation
Filioque
15th century in the Republic of Florence
Byzantine Empire–Holy See relations